China National Aero-Technology Import & Export Corporation (CATIC) is a Chinese state-owned defense company with a core business in aviation products and technology. It is the exclusive representative of the Aviation Industry Corporation of China (AVIC) in the global market.

History
China National Aero-Technology Import & Export Corporation (CATIC), was originally established in 1979, as a state-owned company owned by the Third Ministry of Machine Building of the People's Republic of China. In 1989, it was renamed in Chinese (CATIC), as a state-owned company owned by the Ministry of Aerospace Industry of the People's Republic of China. In 1993, the Ministry of Aerospace Industry of the People's Republic of China was dissolved. The Aviation Industry Corporation of China  (AVIC) was established and CATIC was reorganized into CATIC Group (CATIC Group) in the same year. In 1999, The Aviation Industry Corporation of China (AVIC) was divided into AVIC I and AVIC II and CATIC Group became a joint venture company owned by the two groups. In 2008, AVIC I and AVIC II were integrated into the Aviation Industry Corporation of China (AVIC) and CATIC Group became its wholly owned subsidiary. In 2009, CATIC Group was reorganized into two different corporations, i.e. AVIC International Holding Corporation (AVIC INTL) and China National Aero-Technology Import & Export Corporation (CATIC), both under AVIC.

Products and services
CATIC is headquartered in Beijing. As a state authorized dealer of aviation products, CATIC has exported fighters, trainers, bombers, helicopters, transporters, UAVs, general aviation aircraft and associated airborne equipment and ground support equipment as well as various components and spare parts of military and civil purposes to more than 30 countries. Through multinational cooperation, CATIC has invested and developed high-performance aircraft such as K-8 trainer, JF-17 fighter and EC-120 helicopter.

Specialized companies and regional subsidiaries of CATIC in Beijing, Shanghai, Guangzhou, Shenzhen, Zhuhai, Xiamen, Fujian, Hangzhou, Dalian and Harbin focus on non-aviation business in commerce, finance, real estate, hotel and real estate management, public tendering and bidding, machinery procurement, civil construction, logistics, investment, leasing, e-business, etc. Their main products include ships, civil engineering machinery, food processing machines, medical equipment, container inspection systems, automobiles, motorcycles, bicycles and spare services. In addition, CATIC has contracted international construction projects for countries and regions in Asia, Africa and Middle East.

CATIC is the owner of some famous brands and enterprises: FIYTA watches, Shennan circuit, Tianma LCD, Tianhong shopping mall chains, Jiangnan Securities, etc.

Aircraft
Fighters: J-10, JF-17/FC-1 Thunder, F-7, JH-7E

Trainer Fighter: L-15, FTC-2000, FT-7

Trainer: K-8, PT-6

Helicopter: Z-19, Z-11, Z-10, Z-9, Z-8, AC311, AC312, AC313

Transporter: Y-9, Y-8, MA60, MA600, MA700, Y-12E, Y-12F, LE500

UAVs: Wing Loong, Cloud Shadow, Harrier, U8E

Divisions
The CATIC headquarters in Beijing is assembled by two different divisions, which all under supervised by managing committees.

CATIC also owns two public companies listed on Hong Kong stock market and three companies listed on Shanghai Stock Exchange and Shenzhen Stock Exchange.

Core Business Divisions
 Sales Division
 Product Division
Customer Support Division
Spare Parts Supply Division
 Aviation R&D Division
Aviation Engineering Division

Supporting divisions
 Operation Management Division
Finance & Audit Division
Human Resources Division

References

External links
China National Aero-Technology Import & Export Corporation

Government-owned companies of China
Aerospace companies of China
Manufacturing companies established in 1979
Defence companies of the People's Republic of China
1979 establishments in China
Technology companies established in 1979